Anand Bhawan is a minority catholic educational institution in Barabanki, Uttar Pradesh, India. Founded in 1949 by the Roman Catholic Diocese of Lucknow, it is run by the Institute of the Maids of the Poor, a religious  charitable society. The institution has been an important  educational centre of the city for more than 60 years.

Configuration

The institute is configured of two educational wings (apart from the vocational training institute):

 UP Board Wing (Hindi Medium) affiliated to Uttar Pradesh Board of High School and Intermediate Education, Allahabad, Uttar Pradesh, India.
 ICSE Board Wing (English Medium) affiliated to Council for the Indian School Certificate Examinations, New Delhi, India.

See also
 St. Anthony's School

References

External links
 Anand Bhavan School @ uttarpradeshschools.co.in
 Mention of Anand Bhawan in US Senate Report 1978
 News related to headscarf controversy
 Best Scholarships Anand Bhawan Students
 Anand Bhawan

Catholic secondary schools in India
Primary schools in Uttar Pradesh
High schools and secondary schools in Uttar Pradesh
Christian schools in Uttar Pradesh
Schools in Barabanki, Uttar Pradesh
Educational institutions established in 1949
1949 establishments in India